Claudia Klüppelberg is a German mathematical statistician and applied probability theorist, known for her work in risk assessment and statistical finance. She is a professor emerita of mathematical statistics at the Technical University of Munich.

Education and career
Klüppelberg completed a doctorate in 1987 at the University of Mannheim. Her dissertation, Subexponentielle Verteilungen und Charakterisierungen verwandter Klassen, was jointly supervised by Horand Störmer and Paul Embrechts.

She earned her habilitation in 1993 at ETH Zurich. Then, she became a professor of applied statistics at Johannes Gutenberg University Mainz, and moved to the Technical University of Munich in 1997. She retired to become a professor emerita in 2019.

Books
Klüppelberg is the co-author of
Modelling Extremal Events: for Insurance and Finance (with Paul Embrechts and Thomas Mikosch, Springer, 1997)
She is the co-editor of
Complex Stochastic Systems (edited with Ole Barndorff-Nielsen and David R. Cox, Chapman & Hall/CRC, 2001)
Risk - A Multidisciplinary Introduction (edited with Daniel Straub and Isabell M. Welpe, Springer, 2014)

Recognition
Klüppelberg was awarded the Order of Merit of the Federal Republic of Germany and the Bavarian state order  in 2001. She is a Fellow of the Institute of Mathematical Statistics, and was a Medallion Lecturer of the Institute of Mathematical Statistics in 2009.

References

Year of birth missing (living people)
Living people
German statisticians
Women statisticians
Probability theorists
University of Mannheim alumni
Academic staff of Johannes Gutenberg University Mainz
Academic staff of the Technical University of Munich
Recipients of the Cross of the Order of Merit of the Federal Republic of Germany
Fellows of the Institute of Mathematical Statistics
Mathematical statisticians